(born August 30, 1944) is a Japanese actress born in Kyoto, Japan. She has starred in several movies, notably Gate of Flesh (1964), a Japanese erotic film, part of a trilogy of films she made with director Seijun Suzuki. Including Story of a Prostitute (1965) and Carmen from Kawachi (1966), these films are known as Nogawa's "Flesh Trilogy". Nogawa has appeared in numerous films in Japan, including director Nagisa Oshima's The Pleasures of the Flesh (1965) and Zatoichi and the Fugitives (1968), the eighteenth film in the Zatoichi series. She has also appeared in television series on Nippon Television, TV Tokyo, Fuji TV, and NHK.

Filmography
 Gate of Flesh (1964) - Maya
 Kunoichi ninpō (1964) - Sen hime
 Story of a Prostitute (1965) - Harumi
 The Pleasures of the Flesh (1965) - Hitomi
 Carmen from Kawachi (1966) - Carmen
 A Certain Killer (1967) - Keiko
 Daimon Otokode Shinitai (1969)
 Battles Without Honor and Humanity: Final Episode (1974) - Kaoru Sugita
 Hokuriku Proxy War (1977)
 Okinawan Boys (1983)
 Ruten no umi (1990) - Fusae Matsuzaka
 The Geisha House (1999) - Michiko
 The Sea Is Watching (2002) - Omine
 The Book Peddler (2016) - Sachi Toda

Television
 Hissatsu Shiokinin (1973) -Okin
 Tasukenin Hashiru (1974)
 Choshichiro Edo Nikki (1983-91)
 Dokuganryū Masamune (1987) - Asahi no kata
 Last Cinderella (2013) - Setsuko Takenouchi

References

External links
 
 
 
 

Japanese film actresses
Living people
1944 births